Acronicta tiena is a moth of the family Noctuidae. It is found in western China.

tiena
Moths of Asia
Moths described in 1907